Morella could refer to:

Places
 Morella, Castellón, an ancient city, Valencian Community, Spain
 Morella, Queensland, now part of Longreach, Australia
 La Morella, a mountain in Catalonia, Spain

People
 Connie Morella (born 1931), a Republican US politician
 Morella Muñoz (born 1935), Venezuelan mezzo-soprano
 Morella Joseph, politician from St Lucia

Biology 
 Morella, a plant genus associated with Myrica
 Morella (fungus), a genus in the family Olpidiaceae

Other uses 
 Morella (short story), by Edgar Allan Poe
 , a steamship
 Morella's Forest, a US band

See also
Marella (disambiguation)
Morello (disambiguation)